Yeshiva Gedolah of Los Angeles (YGLA), also known in English as Michael Diller High School, is a Haredi Jewish high school located in the Fairfax District, Los Angeles. It was established in 1978.

The current Dean and Rosh Yeshiva is Rabbi Eliezer Gross.  The executive director and Administrator is Rabbi Yossi Gross, one of the Rosh Yeshiva's sons; the school's Secular Studies Principal is Rabbi Shmuel Baruch Manne. The school also operates a Beis Medrash Program for two years, starting in 12th grade (when most students stop taking secular classes) and going on for a year afterwards, led by Rabbi Aron Tzvi Gross and Rabbi Aron Gettinger.

With one of its founding members (Rabbi Dovid Grossman) being a graduate of Beis Medrash Govoha (BMG) and YGLA sending many of its graduates to BMG, the hashkafa—or theological leaning—of the Yeshiva is very much aligned with the Litvish stream of Haredi Judaism. YGLA is best known within the wider Haredi, Yeshivish community for emphasizing its intense Talmud program, with mandatory morning, afternoon, and night seders (the first two being classes and the last one chavrusa learning).

While its secular studies program is very sparse and normally doesn't meet California's requirements for a high school diploma, which is commonplace for Haredi high schools that overwhelmingly focus on Talmud study, students can opt to take extra classes in order to receive a diploma. YGLA's website claims that "our students exceed the national average for their SAT testing results, and several have become National Merit Finalists." Most of their students do not take the SAT since it is quite rare for a student to go to college.

YGLA's students are known in the Fairfax/La Brea area for enthusiastically eliciting donations on Purim, and the school made local news because of a carpenters' union protest about the contractor YGLA was using to build a new building.

Donald Sterling donated $50,000 to YGLA in 2010 and as a result the school put up a sign saying "Donald T. Sterling Pavilion" on its building. During the scandal after private recordings of Sterling making racist comments were made public, YGLA covered up the sign.

References 

1978 establishments in California
Ashkenazi Jewish culture in Los Angeles
High schools in Los Angeles
High schools in Los Angeles County, California
Jewish day schools in California
Lithuanian-Jewish culture in the United States
Orthodox Jewish educational institutions
Orthodox Judaism in Los Angeles
Orthodox yeshivas in the United States
Private high schools in California
Schools in Los Angeles